Alina Deutsch is a Romanian-American electronics engineer who worked for many years at Thomas J. Watson Research Center on topics including interconnects for Very Large Scale Integration.

Education and career
Deutsch is originally from Bucharest. She graduated from Columbia University with an electrical engineering degree in 1971, and joined IBM in the same year. She earned a master's degree from Syracuse University in 1976, and retired in 2009.

She was named a Fellow of the IEEE in 1999, "for contributions to the design of practical lossy transmission line structures for digital and communication applications".

Other activities
Her translation was published in 1996 by Black Sea Publications.

In her retirement she became an amateur impressionist painter, and moved from Westchester County, New York to Houston, Texas.

References

Year of birth missing (living people)
Living people
American electronics engineers
American women engineers
Romanian electrical engineers
Romanian women engineers
Columbia School of Engineering and Applied Science alumni
Syracuse University alumni
Fellow Members of the IEEE
Romanian emigrants to the United States
21st-century American women